Expensive Pain is the fifth studio album by American rapper Meek Mill. It was released on October 1, 2021, through Atlantic Records And Maybach Music Group. The production on the album was handled by multiple producers including Boi-1da, Tay Keith, Vinylz, 30 Roc, Cardo and Sevn Thomas among others. The album also features guest appearances from Lil Baby, Lil Durk, Kehlani, ASAP Ferg, Moneybagg Yo, Giggs, Young Thug, Vory, Lil Uzi Vert, and Brent Faiyaz.

Expensive Pain was supported by three singles: "Flamerz Flow", "Sharing Locations" and "Blue Notes 2". The album received generally mixed to positive reviews from music critics, and was a commercial success. It debuted at number three on the US Billboard 200 chart, earning 95,000 album-equivalent units in its first week.

Release and promotion
Meek announced the album, cover art, and release date on September 15, 2021. He revealed the tracklist on September 30, the day before the album was released. The album cover art was made by modern artist Nina Chanel Abney.

Singles
Three singles preceded the album's release. "Flamerz Flow" is a bonus track, and it was released with a music video on May 31, 2021, to his YouTube channel, being officially released three days later. "Sharing Locations" featuring Lil Baby and Lil Durk was released on August 27 with a video as the second single. Then "Blue Notes 2" featuring Lil Uzi Vert was the third single, released with a video five days later and performed live on The Tonight Show Starring Jimmy Fallon on September 21.

Critical reception

Expensive Pain was met with generally mixed to positive reviews. At Metacritic, which assigns a normalized rating out of 100 to reviews from professional publications, the album received an average score of 64, indicating “generally favorable reviews”, based on six reviews.

A.D. Amorosi of Variety praised Meek's progression with this effort calling "Expensive Pain Mill’s best, most fully rounded recorded effort: an album that finally portrays all sides of the rapper’s rise, fall, struggles and revivals, to say nothing of his skills as a writer and as an aggressive flow-acist." He also prasied Mill's braggadocios approach to many of the songs on the project, saying that "Mill comes out with hope and real brio on his side – a confidence that goes way beyond any mere humble-brag or boast."

Commercial performance
Expensive Pain debuted at number three on the US Billboard 200 chart, earning 95,000 album-equivalent units (including 10,000 copies in pure album sales) in its first week. This became Meek Mill's fifth US top-ten debut on the chart. The album also accumulated a total of 110.53 million on-demand streams from the songs on the project. In its second week, the album dropped to number four on the chart, earning an additional 46,000 units.

Track listing

Sample credits
 "Intro (Hate on Me)" contains samples of "Hate Me Now", written by Nasir Jones, Sean Combs and Gavin Marchand, as performed by Nas, which itself samples "Carmina Burana", written and composed by Carl Orff.
 "Sharing Locations" contains uncredited samples of "Chichovite", performed by 1200.
 "Me (FWM)" contains samples from "Bia’ Bia’", written by Jonathan Smith, Todd Shaw, Stephanie Martin and Sammie Norris, as performed by Lil Jon.
 "Blue Notes 2" is a sequel to "Blue Notes" from DC4, and they both sample "Midnight Blues", performed by Snowy White.

Personnel

 Meek Mill – Vocals (all tracks)
 Popcaan – Vocals (1)
 Sadie Kraft – Vocals (2)
 Lil Baby – Vocals (4)
 Lil Durk – Vocals (4)
 Jena Goldsack – Vocals (5)
 Kehlani – Vocals (6)
 ASAP Ferg – Vocals (7)
 Moneybagg Yo – Vocals (8)
 Giggs – Vocals (10)
 Young Thug – Vocals (11)
 Vory – Vocals (12)
 Lil Uzi Vert – Vocals (14)
 Brent Faiyaz – Vocals (17)
 Cardo – Production (1, 2, 10)
 Nick Papz – Production (4, 8, 14)
 Xander – Production (4, 8, 14)
 Austin Powerz – Production (6, 16, 17)
 Fuse – Production (3, 13)
 KJ – Production (4, 8)
 Boi-1da – Production (7, 12)
 Yung Exclusive – Production (1)
 Johnny Juliano – Production (1)
 Deats – Production (2)
 Yugo Getit – Production (3)
 Gingr – Production (3)
 JW Lucas – Production (3)
 Svdominik – Production (4)
 DZL – Production (5)
 Sav – Production (6)
 Hollywood Cole – Production (7)
 Jahaan Sweet – Production (7)
 Eza – Production (8)
 AT – Production (9)
 Gebrelul – Production (9)
 Emkay – Production (10)
 Tay Keith – Production (11)
 Denaro Love – Production (11)
 Minor2Go – Production (11)
 Maneesh – Production (12)
 Vinylz – Production (12)
 Amore – Production (13)
 Dato – Production (13)
 Dougie on the Beat – Production (15)
 Bkorn – Production (16)
 Brent Faiyaz – Production (17)
 Sevn Thomas – Production (17)
 Paperboy Fabe – Production (17)
 L.3.G.I.O.N. – Production (17)
 30 Roc – Production (18)
 Datboi Squeeze – Production (18)
 Vianey OJ – Co-production (5)
 Darko – Co-production (5)

Charts

Weekly charts

Year-end charts

References

 

2021 albums
Meek Mill albums
Atlantic Records albums
Maybach Music Group albums
Albums produced by Tay Keith